The Roman Catholic Diocese of Jaboticabal is a diocese located in the city of Jaboticabal in the Ecclesiastical province of Ribeirão Preto in Brazil.

History
 25 January 1929: Established as Diocese of Jaboticabal from the Diocese of São Carlos do Pinhal

Bishops
 Bishops of Jaboticabal (Roman rite), in reverse chronological order
 Bishop Eduardo Pinheiro da Silva, S.D.B. (2015.04.22 - ...)
 Bishop Fernando Antônio Brochini, C.S.S. (2003.06.25 – 2014.10.05), appointed;Bishop of Itumbiara, Goias
 Bishop Luíz Eugênio Pérez (1981.06.07 – 2003.06.25)
 Bishop José Varani (1961.02.07 – 1981.06.07)
 Archbishop (personal title) Antônio Augusto de Assis (1931.07.31 – 1961.02.07)

Coadjutor bishops
José Varani (1950-1961)
Fernando Antônio Brochini, C.S.S. (2001-2003)

Auxiliary bishop
Gabriel Paulino Bueno Couto, O. Carm. (1946-1954), appointed Auxiliary Bishop of Curitiba, Parana

Other priests of this diocese who became bishops
José de Lanza Neto, appointed Auxiliary Bishop of Londrina, Parana in 2004
Milton Kenan Júnior, appointed Auxiliary Bishop of São Paulo in 2009
Wilson Luís Angotti Filho, appointed Auxiliary Bishop of Belo Horizonte, Minas Gerais in 2011

References
 GCatholic.org
 Catholic Hierarchy
  Diocese website (Portuguese)

Roman Catholic dioceses in Brazil
Christian organizations established in 1929
Jaboticabal, Roman Catholic Diocese of
Roman Catholic dioceses and prelatures established in the 20th century